Leicestershire was a county constituency in Leicestershire, represented in the House of Commons. It elected two Members of Parliament (MPs), traditionally called Knights of the Shire, by the bloc vote system of election, to the Parliament of England until 1707, to the Parliament of Great Britain from 1707 until 1800, and then to Parliament of the United Kingdom until 1832.

History
The constituency was abolished by the Reform Act 1832 for the 1832 general election, when it was replaced by the Northern and Southern divisions, each of which elected two MPs.

Both divisions were abolished by the Redistribution of Seats Act 1885 for the 1885 general election, when they were replaced by four new single-seat constituencies: Bosworth, Harborough, Loughborough and Melton.

Members of Parliament

1290–1640

1640–1832

References

Parliamentary constituencies in Leicestershire (historic)
Constituencies of the Parliament of the United Kingdom established in 1290
Constituencies of the Parliament of the United Kingdom disestablished in 1832